Coleophora basistrigella is a moth of the family Coleophoridae. It is found in the United States, including Colorado.

References

basistrigella
Moths described in 1877
Moths of North America